The Injured Lovers; Or, The Ambitious Father is a 1688 tragedy by the English writer William Mountfort. It was premiered by the United Company at the Theatre Royal, Drury Lane.

The original cast included Thomas Betterton as Rheusanes, Joseph Williams as King of Sicily, Philip Griffin as  Ghinotto, William Mountfort as Dorenalus, Samuel Sandford as Old Colonel, Cave Underhill as Soldier, Thomas Jevon as Soldier, Elizabeth Barry as Princess Oryala and Anne Bracegirdle as Antelina.

References

Bibliography
 Van Lennep, W. The London Stage, 1660-1800: Volume One, 1660-1700. Southern Illinois University Press, 1960.

1688 plays
West End plays
Tragedy plays
Plays by William Mountfort